Declan O'Sullivan (born 18 December 1983) is an Irish former sportsperson. He last played Gaelic football with his local club Dromid Pearses, his divisional side South Kerry and at senior level for the Kery county team between 2003 and his retirement in 2014.

O'Sullivan captained Kerry to back-to-back All-Ireland titles in 2006 and 2007. He is regarded as one of the all-time great centre forwards.

Since retirement, O'Sullivan has taken the role of selector with the Kerry minor team for the 2015 season. As part of Jack O Connor's backroom team, in O'Sullivan's first season as selector, they captured the All-Ireland title. While O'Connor completed the historic back-to-back All-Ireland titles. O'Sullivan joined Jack O'Connor as selector for the Kerry under-21 football team for the 2016 Championship season.

Playing career

Club
South Kerry
Born in Cahersiveen, County Kerry, O'Sullivan plays his club football with his local club Dromid Pearses and with his divisional side South Kerry and has enjoyed much success. After garnering minor and under-21 county titles with South Kerry, he later went on to become a star at senior level.

In 2004 O'Sullivan tasted victory for the first time as a footballer when South Kerry qualified for the final of the county senior championship. The opponents on that occasion were Laune Rangers. The divisional side were far too powerful on that occasion and secured a 1–13 to 2–5 victory. It was O'Sullivan's first county senior winners' medal.

O'Sullivan's South Kerry side reached the county final again in 2005, this time with Dr. Croke's providing the opposition.  In what was considered a dream final, the game turned into a close affair. After the sixty minutes South Kerry retained their title and O'Sullivan picked up a second county winners' medal.

In 2006 South Kerry still dominated the club championship in Kerry. The final that year was a repeat of 2005 as Dr. Crokes set out on a revenge mission.  The game developed into an extremely tense battle with no side taking a substantial lead. At the full-time whistle South Kerry just about retained their title for a third consecutive year on a score line of 0–12 to 1–8. It was O'Sullivan's third county winners' medal.

South Kerry had the chance to make history in 2007 by capturing a fourth consecutive county title.  All went to plan as the divisional side found little difficulty in reaching the final once again. A divisional side from the other half of the county, Feale Rangers provided the opposition. The game was an extremely close affair, however, O'Sullivan's side were finally bested as Rangers went on to win by 1–5 to 0–6.

In 2009 for the third time in 5 years South Kerry and Dr. Crokes faced each other in the county final. South Kerry ran out one point winners on a score line of 1–08 to 0-10 giving Sullivan a fourth county championship medal.

Dromid Pearses
In 2004 he helped Dromid Pearses win their first ever South Kerry Senior Football Championship beating St Marys on a scoreline of 0–09 to 0–07 in the final.

After losing out in 2010 O'Sullivan led Dromid Pearses back to the final of the Junior County Championship but this time thanks to 4 O'Sullivan landed Dromid Pearses their first Junior title. The later added the Munster Junior Club Football Championship title to their winnings for the year.

Inter-county
Declan made his first championship appearance for Kerry in 2003 against Tipperary.	
He won the National Football League and All-Ireland Senior Football Championship 2004 with Kerry, beating Mayo GAA comfortably. In 2005 aged just 21, O'Sullivan was named Kerry senior football captain. It was slightly less successful for O'Sullivan, with Tyrone GAA beating Kerry in the All-Ireland semi-final. In 2006 O'Sullivan captained Kerry to a comprehensive All-Ireland final victory over Mayo in the All-Ireland Senior Football Championship 2006 final. He had lost his place in the side after the Munster Final Replay defeat to Cork and was booed off by a minority of his own fans. However, he won his place back to lead the team out for the All Ireland Final and scored the opening goal in the 4–15 to 3-05 demolition of Mayo before leading the team up the steps to lift Sam Maguire and shared the honour with Colm Cooper (who had captained the side in his absence). Again Kerry had completed a League-Championship double.

In 2007, O'Sullivan had easily his best year so far, scoring a crucial goal against Monaghan and scoring 1–03 in a man of the match performance against Dublin, the latter coming in the classic semi-final. O'Sullivan was the winner of the Opel Gaelic Player of the Month award for August, and Kerry went on to claim the All-Ireland title by thrashing Cork 3–13 to
1–9. Kerry ironically became the first team to win consecutive titles since Cork in 1990 the same day, and O'Sullivan became the first man since Tony Hanahoe in 1977 to lift the Sam Maguire twice as captain.  O'Sullivan was selected at centre-forward on the GAA All-Stars Awards team.

Declan is also the winner of a Munster minor football championship and a Munster Under-21 football championship as well as having Munster and All-Ireland Vocational Schools championship medals.

Declan is the fourth person after Dick Fitzgerald, John Joe Sheehy and Joe Barrett to twice captain Kerry to All-Ireland glory.
He is also only one of eight people to lift the Sam Maguire cup twice.

He was replaced by Paul Galvin as captain of the Kerry footballers for the 2008 season. O'Sullivan also received a knee injury in June which ruled him out for eight weeks. This injury caused him to miss the 2008 Munster final. It would be 6 years before he failed to start another championship game. O'Sullivan returned to the Kerry starting 15 for the qualifier victory over Monaghan and followed that up with 4 points in Kerry's classic All Ireland quarter final victory over Galway at a floodlit Croke Park. He also scored a goal in Kerry's semi final replay victory over Cork. In the 2008 All Ireland senior football final against Tyrone, O'Sullivan contributed 2 points but famously missed great goal chance 4 minutes from time which would have given Kerry the lead. In the end Kerry were beaten by 4 points. At the end of the year O'Sullivan won his 2nd all-star award.

2009 was a turbulent year for Kerry football. After being knocked out of the Munster championship by great rivals Cork, they were on the brink of elimination from the All Ireland series by minnows Sligo. On a dramatic evening in Tralee, Kerry were saved by heroic performances by O'Sullivan (0-04)and Paul Galvin (0-03) as they scraped through by a single point. Following another labored victory over Antrim, Kerry progressed to an All Ireland quarter final against old rivals Dublin. Kerry were considered huge underdogs but produced one of the greatest performances in their storied history to win on a score line of 1–24 to 1-07, O'Sullivan contributing 0–03 in a magnificent performance. Following a low key semi final victory over Meath, Kerry progressed to another final meeting with Cork. O'Sullivan was once again a key figure as he claimed his 4th all Ireland winners medal at the age of 25. He also won a 3rd consecutive all-star award.

2010 began well for Kerry as wins over Cork and Limerick saw them regain the Munster title. However they were stunned by Down in the All Ireland quarter final. This defeat marked the 1st time in O'Sullivan's inter-county career that Kerry failed to reach the All Ireland semi final.

Kerry enjoyed a more successful year in 2011. They beat Cork retain their Munster title, with O'Sullivan (0-05) producing a truly breathtaking performance. Victories over Limerick and Mayo saw O'Sullivan and Kerry reach their 7th final in 8 years. In the final Kerry looked to be on course for victory but were stunned by a late Dublin comeback to lose by a single point. O'Sullivan had to endure the heartbreak of losing possession in the lead up to Dublin's match winning goal.

2012 proved to be hugely disappointing for O'Sullivan and Kerry. Defeat to Cork in Munster meant another run through the back door was required. A labored win over Westmeath was followed by a hugely emotional 10 point over old foes Tyrone. O'Sullivan contributed 0–03 on a highly charged evening in Killarney. A 19-point thrashing of Clare saw Kerry qualify for the quarter finals yet again. However their season came to an end at the hands of  eventual All Ireland champions Donegal following a 2-point defeat. Afterwards Jack O'Connor resigned as Kerry manager with O'Sullivan's old teammate Eamon Fitzmaurice taking over the reins.

O'Sullivan intended to sit out the entire 2013 national league campaign but after Kerry lost their opening 4 games he returned to help the team's fight against relegation. O'Sullivan was crucial to Kerry's eventual survival, playing a starring role in their crucial win over Tyrone in Omagh.
The championship began better for Fitzmaurice's men when wins over Tippearary, Waterford and Cork saw them win yet another Munster. O'Sullivan (playing in a more advanced role) was again crucial as he bagged a goal against Waterford in the semi final. He then scored 2 points and set up Colm Cooper for the crucial goal in the final as he claimed a 7th provincial medal. A comfortable win over Cavan saw Kerry progress to a semi final against Dublin. Here the age old rivals would produce a modern classic. O'Sullivan again suffered heartache as he missed a 69th minute chance to put Kerry ahead before Dublin won the match with 2 late late goals.

O'Sullivan turned 30 in December 2013 and sat out the entire 2014 national league campaign in order to deal with various injuries. He returned to score 2 points in Kerry's narrow Munster final win over Clare but aggravated an already troublesome knee injury. O'Sullivan appeared for the 2014 Munster final against Cork with both his knees heavily strapped. However he still managed to produce one of the greatest performances of his remarkable career. Playing in a more withdrawn "quarterback role" O'Sullivan showed the full range of his playmaking abilities as Kerry ran out 12 winners. O'Sullivan started the quarter final win over Galway but was subsequently benched due to his ongoing knee issues. The drawn semi final with Mayo marked the 1st championship game Kerry had started without him since the 2008 munster final. His final 3 appearances of the season came from the bench as Kerry claimed their 37th All Ireland title. Their victory over Donegal gave O'Sullivan his 5th All Ireland medal and confirmed his status as one of the greatest players in the history of the game. Afterwards manager Eamon Fitzmaurice confirmed O'Sullivan would need surgery on both knees over the winter but expressed confidence that he would return in 2015.

In November 2014, O'Sullivan announced his retirement due to injury.	
In a released statement he said "“Today, I would like to announce my retirement from inter-county football, It has been an incredibly difficult decision to arrive at but, after a lot of consideration, I feel now is the right time. Unfortunately, due to some long-standing injuries, it would be impossible for me to physically compete at the required level in 2015. Hopefully, after a long rest and some corrective work on my knees, I will be able to enjoy playing with my club for a number of years to come".

Honours

Dromd Pearses/South Kerry
Kerry Senior Football Championship:
Winner (5): 2004, 2005, 2006, 2009, 2015
Runner-up (2): 2007, 2011
Kerry Junior Football Championship:
Winner (1) : 2011
Runner-up (1) : 2010Kerry Under-21 Football Championship:Winner (2): 2003, 2004Kerry Minor Football Championship:Winner (3): 1999, 2000, 2001South Kerry Senior Football Championship:Winner (1): 2004

KerryAll-Ireland Senior Football Championship:Winner (5): 2004, 2006 (c), 2007 (c), 2009, 2014
Runner-up (4): 2002 (sub), 2005 (c), 2008, 2011Munster Senior Football Championship:Winner (6): 2003, 2004 (sub), 2005 (c), 2007 (c) 2010, 2011, 2013, 2014
Runner-up (2): 2006 (c), 2008National Football League:Winner (3): 2004, 2006 (c), 2009
Runner-up (1): 2008Munster Under-21 Football Championship:Winner (1): 2002
Runner-up (2): 2003, 2004Munster Minor Football Championship:Winner (1): 2001

SchoolsMunster Colleges A Championship:Winner (2): 2001, 2002All-Ireland Vocational Schools Senior Championship:Winner (1): 2000All-Ireland Vocational Schools Junior Championship:Winner (1): 2000Other :''' 
All Ireland Interfrim Junior Football Championship (2014) - Lieberr 
Munster Interfirm Senior Football Championship (2004) - AIB Kerry
Munster Interfirm Junior Football Championship  (2014) - Lieberr
Kerry Interfirm Senior Football Championship  (2004)  - AIB Kerry
Kerry Interfirm Junior Football Championship  (2014) - Lieberr

See also
 List of All-Ireland Senior Football Championship winning captains

References

1984 births
Living people
All Stars Awards winners (football)
All-Ireland-winning captains (football)
Dromid Pearses Gaelic footballers
Gaelic football selectors
Kerry inter-county Gaelic footballers
South Kerry Gaelic footballers
Winners of four All-Ireland medals (Gaelic football)